This is a list of all former units and aircraft stationed at Celle Air Base – also named Immelmann-Kaserne (Immelmann-Barracks).

Current units and aircraft as well as detailed information about the base can be found at Celle Air Base.

Units

Aircraft

References 
 
 
 
 

Celle Air Base